David Jackson (March 7, 1852 – December 19, 1925) was a farmer and political figure in Manitoba. He represented Hamiota from 1903 to 1907 in the Legislative Assembly of Manitoba as a Liberal.

He was born in Hemmingford, Canada East, the son of William Jackson and Mary Scott. Jackson was married twice: first to Mary A. Wilson in 1875 and then to Fannie Dennison in 1882. He died in Vancouver in 1925.

References 

1852 births
Manitoba Liberal Party MLAs
Canadian Methodists
1925 deaths